To look is to use sight to perceive an object.

Look or The Look may refer to:

Businesses and products 
 Look (modeling agency), an Israeli modeling agency
 Look (American magazine), a defunct general-interest magazine
 Look (UK magazine), a defunct fashion and celebrity magazine
 Look (cigarette), a Danish brand
 Look!, a candy bar made by Annabelle Candy Company
 Look (company), a French bicycle components and frames

Film and television 
 The Look, a 2003 American film starring Teresa Hill
 Look (2007 film), an American drama by Adam Rifkin
 LOOK: The Series, an American television drama series, also by Adam Rifkin, related to the film
 Look (2009 film), an American avant-garde short film directed by Ryan Pickett
 "The Look", an episode of American television sitcom Home Improvement

Music 
 Look (Beth Nielsen Chapman album)
 Look (EP), by Apink (2020)
 "Look (Song for Children)", a song by The Beach Boys
 The Look (album), an album by Shalamar
 The Look (band), a UK pop band
 "The Look", a song by Roxette
 "The Look", a song by Metronomy from the album The English Riviera
 "Look", a song by Run On from the album No Way

Other uses 
 Look (surname)
 The Look: Adventures In Rock & Pop Fashion, a book by Paul Gorman
 LOOK algorithm, in computers
 The concept of Gaze in critical theory, sometimes called "the look"
Described in the 1943 book Being and Nothingness by Jean-Paul Sartre
 "The Look", Lauren Bacall's effect when pressing her chin against her chest and to face the camera, tilting her eyes upward

See also
 Look Look Look, a 2006 album by MC Hammer
 Look Up (disambiguation)
 Looking (disambiguation)
 Lookism, discriminatory treatment toward people considered physically unattractive